Boğaziçi is the general term, specific to İstanbul and overlapping administrative divisions, used to denote those parts of the city with a view of the Bosphorus. The respective nuances of the two terms (the strait itself and the urban area of Boğaziçi) being somewhat similar to those between San Francisco Bay and the Bay Area, they are not used interchangeably in correct parlance. 

The term Boğaziçi is used with particular emphasis relating to those parts of İstanbul which are situated north of the Golden Horn (Haliç), starting with the district of Beşiktaş on the European side of the Bosphorus. Thus, the term covers, from south to north, along the European shore, Beşiktaş, Ortaköy, Arnavutköy, Bebek, Rumelihisarı, Baltalimanı, Emirgan, İstinye, Yeniköy, Tarabya, Kireçburnu, Büyükdere and Sarıyer, and along the Asian shore, Beylerbeyi, Çengelköy, Vaniköy, Kandilli, Anadolu Hisarı, Kanlıca and Beykoz.

See also
 Robert College
 Boğaziçi University
 Yalı

Bosphorus